Oxalis corniculata, the creeping woodsorrel, procumbent yellow sorrel or sleeping beauty, is a somewhat delicate-appearing, low-growing herbaceous plant in the family Oxalidaceae. It resembles the common yellow woodsorrel, Oxalis stricta.

Description

It has a narrow, creeping stem that readily roots at the nodes. The trifoliate leaves are subdivided into three rounded leaflets and resemble a clover in shape. Some varieties have green leaves, while others, like Oxalis corniculata var. atropurpurea, have purple. The leaves have inconspicuous stipules at the base of each petiole. The flowers are small and yellow, with some having round-edged petals and others possessing sharp ends. The flowers close when direct sun is not hitting the plant, hence the name "sleeping beauty". Some specimen can have a single flower while others can have over 20.

Pollen is about 34 microns in diameter.

Distribution
This species probably comes from southeastern Asia. It was first described by Linnaeus in 1753 using specimens from Italy, and it seems to have been introduced to Italy from the east before 1500. It is now cosmopolitan in its distribution and is regarded as a weed in gardens, agricultural fields, and lawns.

Uses
The leaves of woodsorrel are quite edible, with a tangy taste of lemons. A drink can be made by infusing the leaves in hot water for about 10 minutes, sweetening and then chilling. The entire plant is rich in vitamin C. Any woodsorrel is safe in low dosages, but if eaten in large quantities over a length of time can inhibit calcium absorption by the body.

As a hyperaccumulator of copper, it can be used for phytoremediation. The 1491 Ming Dynasty text, Precious Secrets of the Realm of the King of Xin, describes how to locate underground copper deposits by extracting trace elements of copper from the plant.

References

External links
Quattrofolium
Jepson Manual Treatment
Photo gallery

corniculata
Oxalidales of Australia
Flora of Norfolk Island
Cosmopolitan species
Flora of Nepal
Plants described in 1753
Taxa named by Carl Linnaeus
Flora of Malta